Gyriscus is a genus of sea snails, marine gastropod mollusks in the family Architectonicidae, the staircase shells or sundials.

Species
Species within the genus Gyriscus include:
 Gyriscus asteleformis Powell, 1965
 Gyriscus hayashii Shikama, 1970
 Gyriscus jeffreysianus (Tiberi, 1867)

References
 SeaLifeBase
 Powell A. W. B., New Zealand Mollusca, William Collins Publishers Ltd, Auckland, New Zealand 1979 

Architectonicidae